The 1871 United States Senate election in Massachusetts was held on January 17, 1871. Incumbent Republican Senator Henry Wilson was re-elected easily to a third term as a member of the Republican Party. Wilson would not finish the term, since he was elected Vice President of the United States in 1872.

At the time, Massachusetts elected United States senators by a majority vote of each separate house of the Massachusetts General Court, the House and the Senate.

Background
At the time, the Massachusetts legislature was dominated the Republican Party, whose members held nearly every seat.

Republican caucus
On January 16, the Republican Party convened in a caucus to renominated Wilson for his third term.

A caucus opposed to Wilson voted against a motion to nominate Wendell Phillips by 6 votes to 3.

Election in the House
On January 17, the House voted for Wilson's re-election and sent the vote to the Senate for ratification.

Election in the Senate
On January 20, the State Senate convened and ratified Wilson's re-election by an overwhelming margin.

References

1871
Massachusetts
United States Senate